Crozzon di Brenta (3,135m) is a mountain in the Brenta Group of the Southern Limestone Alps in Trentino, Italy. It has three summits and is the most popular destination for mountaineering in the Brenta Group. It is connected to its parent peak Cima Tosa by a short ridge.

References

Mountains of Trentino
Mountains of the Alps